Kirill Alfredovich Pirogov (born 4 September 1973) is a Russian film and theatre actor and composer. He has appeared in more than twenty films since 1995. In 2005 he was made an Honoured Artist of the Russian Federation.

Biography
Pirogov was born in Tehran, Iran, to a Russian family. His father worked in the field of foreign trade, engaged in the export and import of heavy road and construction equipment.

Pirogov studied in a theatre studio under the leadership of Sergei Kazarnovsky and also graduated from music school. His parents saw a future for him in a more serious profession, wanting their son to study at university. However, the decision was already made, and in 1994 Pirogov graduated from the Boris Shchukin Theatre Institute school (the course of Vladimir Ivanov). Then he received an offer to play in the theatre "Workshop of Peter Fomenko" (and was the first who was taken to the theatre "from the side").

Selected filmography

References

External links 

 
 Official website 

1973 births
People from Tehran
Living people
Russian male film actors
Russian male television actors
Russian male stage actors
21st-century Russian male actors
Russian composers
Russian male composers
Male actors from Moscow
Honored Artists of the Russian Federation
Audiobook narrators